Emilio Merino Lacoste (born 3 February 1950) was the 35th Mayor of the commune of Pichilemu, office which he held between 16 March 1982 and 30 August 1984, after being appointed by the military government of General Augusto Pinochet. He also was the Mayor of Paredones between 1980 and 1981.

Biography

Political career
Emilio Merino Lacoste was appointed Mayor of Pichilemu by the military government of General Augusto Pinochet in 1982. He succeeded Julio Waidele Wolff, and held the office until 30 August 1984, when the military government appointed René Maturana Maldonado.

References

1950 births
Living people
People from Valparaíso Region
Mayors of Pichilemu